Osijek bus station is the principal bus station in Osijek, Croatia. It was opened in 2011 and it is the most modern station in Croatia.

Construction 

Construction of station lasted from 2007 to 2011, when it was ceremonially opened on 3 June. City of Osijek invested 22,000 square meters of land and 5.2 million HRK for landscaping. Total construction cost was 120 million HRK. Investor and contractor was Osijek-Koteks.

In construction of building was invested 10,000 square meters of concrete, million kilograms of armature, 450 tons of load-bearing structures and 3,000 square meters of glass.

Notes and references

Notes 
a  In accordance of Agreement of Public-Private partnership, Osijek-Koteks d.d. will be owner of station in period of 30 years after opening of station, respectively up to 2041, when City of Osijek will become owner of station.

References 

Buildings and structures in Osijek
Bus stations in Croatia